Bridget Wishart (born 25 February 1962) is an English vocalist, musician and performance artist. She was a member of English rock band Hawkwind from 1989 to 1991. Wishart was the first woman to sing lead vocals in Hawkwind, and is the band's only singing frontwoman in their history. She is an ongoing member of Spirits Burning (since 2007), and the Chumley Warner Brothers live duo (with partner Martin Plumley).

Early years
Most of the bands that Wishart played with prior to Hawkwind were located around Bath. Her first band was The Demented Stoats in 1979 with future Hawkwind drummer Richard Chadwick and guitarist Steve Bemand, followed by Next Years Big Thing, and then the Hippy Slags. Wishart was later in two other bands with Chadwick and Bemand: Pilwind, and Star Nation.

With Hawkwind
In 1989, Wishart started to perform with Hawkwind, alongside Dave Brock, keyboardist Harvey Bainbridge, bassist Alan Davey, drummer Richard Chadwick, and Simon House on violin. Wishart's role included singing vocals for studio and live songs, and donning costumes and doing mime to enhance songs in the live setting.

This line-up of Hawkwind produced two albums, 1990's Space Bandits and 1991's Palace Springs. Space Bandits spent one week on the UK albums chart at #70. Wishart shared writing credits with Brock and Davey on Space Bandits' opening song, titled "Images." Wishart also shared writing credits with Bainbridge, Brock, and Davey on Palace Springs' Back In The Box.

This line-up also filmed a 1-hour appearance for the Bedrock TV series, later released as the video Nottingham 1990.

1990 saw Hawkwind with Wishart tour the US, the second installment in a series of American visits made at around this time in an effort to re-establish the Hawkwind brand in America. After a European tour in March and April 1991 (with Steve Bemand filling in for Dave Brock), Wishart ended her association with the group.

With Spirits Burning
Wishart returned to music in 2007, accepting an invite from Don Falcone of Spirits Burning. Since 2007, Wishart and Don Falcone have collaborated in Spirits Burning (including CDs released under the name Spirits Burning & Bridget Wishart). Wishart and Falcone also have an instrumental project called Astralfish. In 2017, Wishart performed live with Spirits Burning, alongside Steve Bemand, Richard Chadwick, Kev Ellis, Don Falcone, Colin Kafka, and Martin Plumley. Wishart sang and played EWI (Electronic Wind Instrument).

With other bands
Wishart has contributed vocals and EWI (Electronic Wind Instrument) to albums by other bands in the space rock, new music, and experimental community, including: Djinn and Hawkestrel (both with former Hawkwind bass player Alan Davey), Astralfish, Bridget Wishart & The Band of Doctors, Hola One with Bridget Wishart, Karda Estra, Mooch, Omenopus, Osiris the Rebirth, and Spaceseed.

Wishart still performs live, as a member of the Chumley Warner Brothers live duo (with partner Martin Plumley).

Discography

With Hawkwind
 1990: Space Bandits
 1991: Palace Springs
 1992: California Brainstorm
 1994: Live Legends
 1994: 25 Years On
 2002: Live in Nottingham 1990
 2005: Glastonbury 90
 2008: The Dream Goes On: From the Black Sword to Distant Horizons
 2009: Treworgey Tree Festival 1989
 2009: USA Tour 1989-1990

With Spirits Burning
 2008: Alien Injection
 2008: Earth Born (by Spirits Burning & Bridget Wishart)
 2009: Our Best Trips: 1998 to 2008
 2009: Bloodlines (by Spirits Burning & Bridget Wishart)
 2010: Crazy Fluid
 2011: Behold The Action Man
 2013: Healthy Music In Large Doses (by Spirits Burning & Clearlight)
 2014: Make Believe It Real (by Spirits Burning & Bridget Wishart)
 2015: Starhawk
 2016: The Roadmap In Your Head (by Spirits Burning & Clearlight)
 2017: "The Roadmap In Your Heart" b/w "Another Roadmap In Your Head" and "An Ambient Heat" (by Spirits Burning & Daevid Allen)
 2018: An Alien Heat (by Spirits Burning & Michael Moorcock)
 2020: The Hollow Lands (by Spirits Burning & Michael Moorcock)
 2021: Evolution Ritual

With other bands and projects

Astralfish
 2012: Far Corners

Bridget Wishart & The Band of Doctors
 2020: Ghost

Hawkestrel
 2019: The Future Is Us

Omenopus
 2010: Portents
 2010: Time Flies
 2011: Allies & Clansmen
 2012: The Plague
 2012: The Next Descendant
 2014: The Archives
 2014: The Omenopus Compendium Of Souvenirs

Personal life
Prior to recording music professionally, Wishart obtained a BA in Fine Art from Newport Art School and an MFA from Reading University. She became a fellow of Gloucestershire College of Arts and Technology, and taught ceramic sculpture at Prior Park College, Bath.

In the 1990s, she was an artist designer and painter for Temple Decor, a UV design company used by WOMAD.

References

1962 births
Living people
Musicians from Plymouth, Devon
English rock singers
20th-century English women singers
20th-century English singers
21st-century English women singers
21st-century English singers
English rock saxophonists
Alumni of the University of Wales
Alumni of the University of Reading
Alumni of the University of Gloucestershire
Hawkwind members
20th-century saxophonists
21st-century saxophonists
20th-century women musicians
21st-century women musicians